Posht Gorg is a village in Kuh Sefid Rural District, in the Central District of Khash County, Sistan and Baluchestan Province, Iran. At the 2006 census, its population was 33, in 5 families.

References 

Populated places in Khash County